Cellana is a genus of sea snails or limpets, marine gastropod molluscs in the family Nacellidae, the true limpets.

Distribution
This genus occurs in the temperate and tropical Indo-Pacific oceans, Hawaii (where they are known as ‘opihi and considered a delicacy) and around Australia and New Zealand. Species are also found around the coasts of Japan, the Red Sea, Mauritius, Madagascar, South Africa and the sub-Antartarctic Islands. One species, Cellana radiata, is cosmopolitan.

These sea snails feed by grazing on green macroalgae growing on rocky substrate in the intertidal zone. Some of these limpets can live up to 7 years, however most do not get older than 2–3 years. They reproduce by broadcasting their spawn in large, yolky eggs in great numbers (between 20,000 for C. flava and C. denticulata to 230,000 for C. ornata).

Species

Species within the genus Cellana include: 
  
 Cellana analogia  Iredale, 1940 
 Cellana ardosiaea (Hombron & Jacquinot, 1841)
 † Cellana bosoensis Kase, T. Nakano, Kurihara & Haga, 2013 
 Cellana capensis (Gmelin, 1791)
 † Cellana carpenteriana Skwarko, 1966
 Cellana conciliata Iredale, 1940    - Rainbow limpet
 † Cellana cophina Powell, 1973
 Cellana craticulata Suter, 1905
 † Cellana cudmorei Chapman & Gabriel, 1923
 Cellana cylindrica (Gmelin, 1791)
 † Cellana deformis (K. Martin, 1883)Powell
 Cellana denticulata Martyn, 1784
 Cellana dira (Reeve, 1855)
 Cellana enneagona (Reeve, 1854)
 Cellana eucosmia Pilsbry, 1891 (possibly synonym of C. grata)
 Cellana exarata - Hawaiian blackfoot opihi
 Cellana flava Hutton, 1873
 Cellana granostriata (Reeve, 1855)
 Cellana grata Gould, 1859
 Cellana grata stearnsi Pilsbry, 1891 
 † Cellana hentyi Chapman & Gabriel, 1923
 Cellana howensis Iredale, 1940 Indo-Pacific 
 † Cellana igniculus Kase, T. Nakano, Kurihara & Haga, 2013 
 † Cellana kamatakiensis Kase, T. Nakano, Kurihara & Haga, 2013 
 Cellana karachiensis Winckworth, 1930 Red Sea 
 † Cellana kobayashii Kase, T. Nakano, Kurihara & Haga, 2013 
 Cellana livescens (Reeve, 1855)
 Cellana mazatlandica Sowerby, 1839 
 Cellana melanostoma Pilsbry, 1891
 Cellana nigrolineata Reeve, 1854
 Cellana oliveri Powell, 1955
 Cellana orientalis (Pilsbry, 1891)
 Cellana ornata Dillwyn, 1817
 Cellana pricei Powell, 1973 
 Cellana radians (Gmelin, 1791)
 Cellana radiata  I. von Born, 1778 
 Cellana radiata capensis (Gmelin, 1791)
 Cellana radiata radiata (Born, 1778)
 Cellana rota (Gmelin, 1791)
 Cellana sandwicensis (Pease, 1861)
 Cellana solida Blainville, 1825
 Cellana sontica Iredale, 1940
 Cellana stellifera Gmelin, 1791
 Cellana strigilis Powell, 1955
 Cellana strigilis strigilis Hombron & Jacquinot, 1841
 Cellana strigilis bollonsi Powell, 1955
 Cellana strigilis chathamensis (Pilsbry, 1891)
 Cellana strigilis flemingi Powell, 1955
 Cellana strigilis oliveri Powell, 1955
 Cellana strigilis redimiculum (Reeve, 1854)
 † Cellana taberna Powell, 1973
 Cellana taitensis Röding, 1798 
 Cellana talcosa Gould, 1846
 Cellana testudinaria Linnaeus, 1758
 † Cellana thomsoni Powell & Bartrum, 1929
 Cellana toreuma Reeve, 1855
 Cellana tramoserica Holten, 1802
 Cellana turbator Iredale, 1940 
 Cellana vitiensis Powell, 1973 
 † Cellana yamamotoi Kase, T. Nakano, Kurihara & Haga, 2013 

The sources given below, also mention the following species : 
 Cellana ampla
 Cellana ardosioea Hombron & Jacquinot, 1841
 Cellana argentata  Sowerby, 1839 
 Cellana enneagona  Reeve, 1854 
 Cellana nigrisquamata Reeve, 1854 
 Cellana profunda mauritiana Pilsbry, 1891 

Species brought into synonymy
 Cellana capensis (Gmelin, 1791): synonym of Cellana radiata (Born, 1778)
 Cellana cernica (Adams, 1869): synonym of Cellana livescens (Reeve, 1855)
 Cellana eudora Iredale, 1940: synonym of Cellana radiata orientalis (Pilsbry, 1891)
 Cellana garconi (Deshayes, 1863): synonym of Cellana livescens (Reeve, 1855)
 Cellana hedleyi W. R. B. Oliver, 1915: synonym of Cellana craticulata (Suter, 1905)
 Cellana laticostata (Blainville, 1825): synonym of Scutellastra laticostata (Blainville, 1825)
 Cellana sagittata  A. A. Gould, 1846 : synonym of Cellana vitiensis Powell, 1973
 Cellana scopulina W. R. B. Oliver, 1926: synonym of Cellana craticulata (Suter, 1905)
 Cellana vulcanicus W. R. B. Oliver, 1915: synonym of Cellana craticulata (Suter, 1905)

References

External links
 Shell-bearing Mollusca: Gastropoda: Archeogastropoda & Mesogastropoda
 Goldstien S. J. (2005).  "Phylogeography of the Cellana limpets of New Zealand: Investigating Barriers to Marine Dispersal and Historical Biogeography". Thesis, School of Biological Sciences, University of Canterbury, Christchurch, New Zealand, 162 pp.
 Powell A. W. B., New Zealand Mollusca, William Collins Publishers Ltd, Auckland, New Zealand 1979 
 Powell A. W. B. (1973). The patellid limpets of the world (Patellidae). Indo-Pacific Mollusca, 3(15): 75-206.
 Willassen E., Williams A. B. & Oskars T. R. (2016). "New observations of the enigmatic West African Cellana limpet (Mollusca: Gastropoda: Nacellidae)". Marine Biodiversity Records 9: 60. .

Nacellidae